This is a list of notable Turkish people, or the Turks, (Turkish: Türkler), who are an ethnic group primarily living in the republic of Turkey and in the former lands of the Ottoman Empire where Turkish minorities have been established. They include people of Turkish descent born in other countries whose roots are in those countries. For Ottoman people see List of Ottoman people.

Actors

Academics

Archaeologists

Ekrem Akurgal
Sedat Alp
Hatice Gonnet-Bağana
Halet Çambel
Tahsin Özgüç

Architects

Art Gallerists 
 Yahşi Baraz (born 1944)

Artists

Authors

A–B

 Yunus Nadi Abalıoğlu
 Sait Faik Abasıyanık
 Halide Edib Adıvar
 Ahmet Ağaoğlu
 Süreyya Ağaoğlu
 Zeynep Ahunbay
 Yusuf Akçura
 Sunay Akın
 Muammer Aksoy
 Mustafa Akyol
 Alev Alatlı
 Sabahattin Ali
 Fikri Alican
 Ahmet Altan
 Çetin Altan
 İhsan Oktay Anar
 Melih Cevdet Anday
 Engin Ardıç
 Meltem Arıkan
 Ayşe Arman
 Cihat Arman
 Ömer Asan
 Duygu Asena
 Bülent Atalay
 Oğuz Atay
 İsmet Atlı
 Nihal Atsız
 Mustafa Balel
 Murat Bardakçı
 Can Bartu
 Enis Batur
 Sevtap Baycılı
 Ali Bayramoğlu
 Ataol Behramoğlu
 İlhan Berk
 Turgut Berkes
 İsmail Beşikçi
 Yahya Kemal Beyatlı
 Üstün Bilgen-Reinart
 Mehmed Emîn Bozarslan
 Rıza Tevfik Bölükbaşı

C–G

 Eyüp Can
 Peride Celal
 Ahmet Hakan Coşkun
 Bekir Coşkun
 Necati Cumalı
 Ahmet Çakar
 Faruk Nafiz Çamlıbel
 Cengiz Çandar
 Hakan Çelik
 Muazzez İlmiye Çığ
 Emin Çölaşan
 Fazıl Hüsnü Dağlarca
 Can Dündar
 Bülent Ecevit
 Asli Erdogan
 Bikem Ekberzade
 Burak Eldem
 Haydar Ergülen
 Azra Erhat
 Mehmet Eroğlu
 Fahir Ersin
 Mehmet Akif Ersoy
 İclal Ersin
 Sabahattin Eyüboğlu
 Üzeyir Garih
 Reşat Nuri Güntekin
 Halil Gür
 Uğur Gürses
 Reşit Süreyya Gürsey

H–Q

 Ahmet Haşim
 Abdülhak Şinasi Hisar
 Ahmed Hulusi
 Rıfat Ilgaz
 Atilla İlhan
 Sabit Ince
 Abdi İpekçi
 İsmail Cem İpekçi
 Cevat Şakir Kabaağaçlı
 Metin Kaçan
 Sabri Kalic
 Orhan Veli Kanık
 Ceyhun Atuf Kansu
 Yakup Kadri Karaosmanoğlu
 Orhan Karaveli
 Yaşar Kemal
 Coşkun Kırca
 Necip Fazıl Kısakürek
 Ahmet Taner Kışlalı
 Ahmet Köklügiller
 Doğan Kuban
 Onat Kutlar
 Zülfü Livaneli
 Perihan Mağden
 Nasuh Mahruki
 Uğur Mumcu
 Murathan Mungan
 Nezihe Muhiddin
 Münejjim Bashi
 Behçet Necatigil
 Aziz Nesin
 Sevin Okyay
 Cumhur Oranci
 Irfan Orga
 Altan Öymen
 Setenay Özbek
 İsmet Özel
 Ertuğrul Özkök
 İskender Pala
 Orhan Pamuk
 Lokman Polat

R–Z

 Peyami Safa
 Nejdet Sançar
 Aydilge Sarp
 Ali Riza Seyfi
 Ugur Soldan
 Cemal Süreya
 Elif Şafak
 Aşık Veysel Şatıroğlu
 Erman Şener
 Ferhan Şensoy
 Mahzuni Şerif
 Kemal Tahir
 Ahmet Hamdi Tanpınar
 Cahit Sıtkı Tarancı
 Abdülhak Hâmid Tarhan
 Latife Tekin
 Neyzen Tevfik
 Arzu Toker
 Metin Toker
 Mahmut Tolon
 Said Nursî
 Osman Nuri Topbaş
 Hasan Ali Toptaş
 Fatma Aliye Topuz
 Hıfzı Topuz
 Cavit Orhan Tütengil
 Halit Ziya Uşaklıgil
 Serhat Ulueren
 Bilge Umar
 Recep Uslu
 Yekta Uzunoglu
 Bahriye Üçok
 Ümit Ünal
 Ahmet Vardar
 Alinur Velidedeoğlu
 Sadık Yemni
 Mehmet Emin Yurdakul
 Can Yücel
 Feridun Zaimoğlu
 Ragıp Zarakolu
 Halide Nusret Zorlutuna
 Zafer Hanım
 Zülfü Livaneli

Aviators 

 Sabiha Gökçen (1913-2001)
 Vecihi Hürkuş (1895-1969)
 Irfan Orga (1908-1970)
 Ali İsmet Öztürk (born 1964)
 Murat Öztürk (aviator) (1953-2013)
 Nezihe Viranyalı (1925-2004) 
 Ahmet Ali Çelikten (1883-1969)

Beauty pageant contestants 

Azra Akın
Günseli Başar
Keriman Halis Ece
Neşe Erberk
Tuğçe Kazaz
Çağla Kubat
Nazlı Deniz Kuruoğlu
Arzum Onan
Leyla Lydia Tuğutlu
Filiz Vural

Business 

İshak Alaton
Albert Jean Amateau
Feyyaz Berker
Serdar Bilgili
Özhan Canaydın
İlhan Cavcav
Aydın Doğan
Bülent Eczacıbaşı
Nejat Eczacıbaşı
Neşe Erberk
Ahmet Ertegun
Üzeyir Garih
Sadi Gülçelik
Rahmi Koç
Vehbi Koç
Temel Kotil
Koç family
Asil Nadir
Ahmet Mücahid Ören
Enver Oren
Sudi Özkan 
Hüsnü Özyeğin
Ali Sabancı
Güler Sabancı
Hacı Sabancı
Hacı Ömer Sabancı
İhsan Sabancı
Mehmet Sabancı
Ömer Sabancı
Özdemir Sabancı
Sakıp Sabancı
Sevil Sabancı
Şevket Sabancı
Demir Sabancı
Kahraman Sadıkoğlu
Ferit Şahenk
Kemal Şahin
Kenan Sahin
Faruk Süren
Yavuz Tatış
Cem Uzan
Ibrahim Uzel
Alp Yalman
Hacı Mehmet Zorlu

By cities

Alanya
List of governors of Alanya

Ankara
Notable people from Ankara

Giresun
List of mayors of Giresun

Istanbul
List of notable people from Istanbul
List of mayors of Istanbul
List of Governors of Istanbul Province

Izmir
List of people from İzmir
List of mayors of İzmir

Mersin
List of mayors of Mersin
Müfide İlhan
Ahmet Kireççi
Nevit Kodallı
Macit Özcan
Seyhan Kurt
Nevin Yanıt
Atıf Yılmaz

Zile
List of mayors of Zile

By country

Austria

Australia

 Tansel Başer
 Sinan Erbil
 İsyan Erdoğan
 John Eren
 Didem Erol
 Aytek Genç
 Ersan Gülüm
 John Ilhan
 Selin Kuralay
 Levent Osman
 Matthew Osman
 Tolgay Özbey
 Sedat Sir
 Adem Somyurek
 Nazlı Süleyman
 Ufuk Talay
 Ramazan Tavşancıoğlu
 Deniz Tek
 Ismail Tosun

Azerbaijan

Ahmet Ağaoğlu
Süreyya Ağaoğlu
Rasim Başak
Nuri Berköz
Servet Çetin
Haydar Hatemi
Cem Karaca
Sinan Şamil Sam
Tamer Karadağlı

Belgium

Bosnia and Herzegovina

Cem Adrian
Ayşegül Aldinç
Ekrem Akurgal
Nejat Biyediç
Hüseyin Beşok
Metin Boşnak
Ömer Çatkıç
Nedim Dal
Ebru Destan
Semih Erden
Şebnem Ferah
Almir Gegić
Coşkun Göğen
Sedat Kapanoğlu
Hakan Köseoğlu
Ayşe Kulin
Süleyman Memnun
Mehmet Okur
Ajda Pekkan
Saffet Sancaklı
Kıvanç Tatlıtuğ
Mirsad Türkcan
Hidayet Türkoğlu
Cem Uzan

Brazil

Luis Cetin

Bulgaria

Canada

Üstün Bilgen-Reinart
Selim Deringil
Orhan Demir
Enis Esmer
Tuğba Karademir
Nil Köksal
Arda Ocal
Semih Tezcan

Cuba

Isaac Guillory

Cyprus

Nej Adamson
Nazim al-Qubrusi
Ulus Baker
Nil Burak
Hussein Chalayan
Alkan Çağlar
Reşat Çağlar
Murat Erdoğan
Osman Ertuğ
İsmet Güney
Kemal İzzet
Muzzy İzzet
Işın Karaca
Kıbrıslı Mehmed Emin Pasha
Kıbrıslı Mehmed Kamil Pasha
Asil Nadir
Yılmaz Orhan
Leon Osman
Omer Riza
Ziynet Sali
Osman Türkay
Vamık Volkan
Fatima Whitbread
Derviş Zaim

Denmark

Yildiz Akdogan
Hasan Al
Yasin Avcı
Saban Özdogan
Yüsüf Öztürk

Egypt

Ihsan Abdel Quddous

France

Seyhan Kurt
Cansel Elçin

Georgia

Sofia Nizharadze

Germany

Hungary

Erol Onaran
Can Togay

Iraq 

İhsan Doğramacı
Sinan Erbil
Mehmet Ali Erbil
Reha Muhtar
Princess Fahrelnissa Zeid
Mehmet Türkmehmet
Ra'ad bin Zeid
Prince Zeid bin Ra'ad

Ireland

Billy Mehmet

Israel

Pini Balili
Umut Güzelses
Meshulam Riklis
Berry Sakharof

Italy

Cem Sultan
Abraham Salomon Camondo
Leyla Gencer
Mehmet Günsür
Nicola Rossi-Lemeni
Ferzan Özpetek
Hugo Pratt

Jordan

Muhanna Al-Dura

Kazakhstan 

Anjelika Akbar

Kosovo 

Soner Özbilen
Ali Haydar Şen
Güner Ureya

Kuwait 

Dina Al-Sabah

Latvia 
Samanta Tīna

Lebanon 

Bilal Aziz
Ahmad Shukeiri

North Macedonia 

Tekin Arıburun
Yahya Kemal Beyatlı
Şebnem Ferah
Srgjan Kerim
Ali Fethi Okyar
Yksel Osmanovski
Sibel Redzep
Esma Redžepova
Tahsin Yazıcı

Morocco

Ali Bourequat
Leïla Chellabi

Mexico

Irán Eory
Maya Jupiter

Netherlands

New Zealand

Ayşe Tezel

Norway

Azar Karadaş
Vendela Kirsebom

Palestine

Ekrem Akurgal

Romania

Mehmet Niyazi
Murat Yusuf

South Africa 

Tatamkulu Afrika

Spain 

Irán Eory
Isaac Guillory
Victoria Kamhi

Sweden 

Kazım Ayvaz
Sıraç Dilber
Serkan İnan
Mehmet Kaplan
Vendela Kirsebom
Emin Nouri
Yksel Osmanovski
Sermin Özürküt
Sibel Redzep
Erkan Zengin

Switzerland

Syria

Yusuf al-Azma

United Kingdom

United States

By type

Precedence
Turkish order of precedence

Assassinated people
List of assassinated people from Turkey

Chiefs of MIT
List of Chiefs of the MIT

Turks of net worth
List of Turks by net worth

Governors of the Central Bank of Turkey
List of Governors of the Central Bank of Turkey

Cartoonists 

Oğuz Aral
Mahmud A. Asrar
Yıldıray Çınar
Onur Demirsoy
Gürbüz Doğan Ekşioğlu
Ihap Hulusi Görey
Cem Kiziltug
Ulas Mangitli
Hasip Pektas
Suat Yalaz
Cem Yılmaz

Centenarians 

Albert Jean Amateau
Celal Bayar
Ahmet Kayhan Dede

Chefs 

CZN Burak
Emel Başdoğan
Hüseyin Özer
Deniz Orhun
Nusret Gökçe
Kadir Nurman

Civil servants

Composers

Diplomats

Doctors 

 Fikri Alican
 Reşit Süreyya Gürsey
 Hulusi Behçet
 Münci Kalayoğlu
 Zeynel A. Karcioglu
 Behram Kurşunoğlu
 Serdar Nasır
 Sabuncuoğlu Şerafeddin
 Mehmet Oz
 Hasan Özbekhan
 Ömer Özkan
 Selahattin Özmen
 Mustafa Ülgen
 Emin Cumhur Şener

Educators 

Hasan Âli Yücel
Haşim İşcan
Hasip Pektas

Entrepreneurs

Entertainers

Comedians

Kemal Sunal
Ercan Yazgan
Beyazıt Öztürk
Cem Yılmaz
Ata Demirer

Theatre directors

Muhsin Ertuğrul
Ferhan Şensoy

Environmentalists 

Kemal Şahin

Fashion designers

 Hussein Chalayan
 Rifat Özbek
 Erdem Moralioğlu

Filmmakers

Film directors

Film producers

Ömer Lütfi Akad
Tunç Başaran
Sinan Çetin
Zeki Demirkubuz
Türker İnanoğlu
Sabri Kalic
Semih Kaplanoğlu
Onat Kutlar
Tolga Örnek
Ali Özgentürk
Halit Refiğ
Mehmet Tanrısever
Atıf Yılmaz

Film score composers

Mazhar Alanson
Fuat Güner
Emir Işılay
Gökhan Kırdar
Erkan Oğur
Ozan Çolakoğlu
Özkan Uğur
Zülfü Livaneli
Melih Kibar

Financiers 

Abraham Salomon Camondo
Hüsnü Özyeğin
Erol Sabancı
Süreyya Serdengeçti
Naim Talu
Berç Türker Keresteciyan
Durmuş Yılmaz

Government and politics 
List of Turkish politicians
List of presidents of Turkey
List of prime ministers of Turkey
List of Turkish diplomats
List of Ministers of Foreign Affairs of Turkey
List of speakers of the Parliament of Turkey
List of presidents of the Constitutional Court of Turkey

Historians 

Abdülhak Adnan Adıvar
Zeynep Ahunbay
Sadri Maksudi Arsal
Murat Bardakçı
Halil Berktay
Muazzez İlmiye Çığ - Sumerologist
Selim Deringil
Şemsettin Günaltay
Ekmeleddin İhsanoğlu
Halil İnalcık
Afet İnan
Kemal Karpat
Reşat Ekrem Koçu
Mehmet Fuat Köprülü
Aydin Sayili
Leyla Neyzi
İlber Ortaylı
Şevket Pamuk
Hikmet Tanyu
Zeki Velidi Togan
Taner Akçam

Journalists 

Yunus Nadi Abalıoğlu
Ahmet Ağaoğlu
Sunay Akın
Muammer Aksoy
Mustafa Akyol
Çetin Altan
Fatih Altaylı
Engin Ardıç
Ayşe Arman
Duygu Asena
İsmet Atlı
Murat Bardakçı
Ali Cimen
Bekir Coşkun
Bikem Ekberzade
Üstün Bilgen-Reinart
Ahmet Çakar
Eyüp Can (journalist)
Cengiz Çandar
Hakan Celik
Emin Çölaşan
Ahmet Hakan Coşkun
Can Dündar
Bülent Ecevit
Burak Eldem
Fahir Ersin
Burhan Felek
Uğur Gürses
Hasan Tahsin
Attilâ İlhan
Balçiçek İlter
Abdi İpekçi
İsmail Cem İpekçi
Yakup Kadri Karaosmanoğlu
Namık Kemal
Coşkun Kırca
Ahmet Taner Kışlalı
Halit Kıvanç
Uğur Mumcu
Altan Öymen
Ertuğrul Özkök
Erman Şener
Hıfzı Topuz
Şerif Turgut
Cavit Orhan Tütengil
Bahriye Üçok
Serhat Ulueren
Ahmet Vardar
Alinur Velidedeoğlu
Ragıp Zarakolu

Judges 

Lütfi Akadlı
Zeki Akar
Sünuhi Arsan
Murat Arslan
Osman Arslan
Ahmet Hamdi Boyacıoğlu
Mustafa Bumin
Sumru Çörtoğlu
Mahmut Cuhruk
Necdet Darıcıoğlu
Uğur İbrahimhakkıoğlu
Hakkı Ketenoğlu
Şevket Müftügil
Nuri Ok
Orhan Onar
Mustafa Yücel Özbilgin
Yekta Güngör Özden
Semih Özmert
İbrahim Senil
Ahmet Necdet Sezer
Osman Şirin
Muhittin Taylan
Tülay Tuğcu
Kani Vrana
Abdurrahman Yalçınkaya

Lawyers 

 Hicri Fişek
 Kemal Kerinçsiz
 Mehmet Ali Şahin
 Köksal Toptan
 Hayati Yazıcı

Magicians 

 Sermet Erkin
 Ertuğrul Işınbark
 İlkay Özdemir
 Zati Sungur

Mathematicians 

Ali Akansu
Selman Akbulut
Cahit Arf
Attila Aşkar
Gelenbevi Ismail Efendi
Feza Gürsey
Halil Mete Soner
Ayşe Soysal
Tosun Terzioğlu
'Abd al-Hamīd ibn Turk
Cem Yıldırım
Yomtov Garti

Military 

 Shlomo Gazit (1926–2020), Israeli head of IDF military intelligence, President of Ben-Gurion University 
List of Chiefs of the Turkish General Staff
List of Commanders of the Turkish Land Forces
List of Commanders of the Turkish Air Force
List of Commanders of the Turkish Naval Forces
List of General Commanders of the Gendarmerie of Turkey
List of Commandants of the Turkish Coast Guard
List of Commanders of the First Army of Turkey

Models 

Azra Akın
Büşra Duran Gündüz
Deniz Akkaya
Vildan Atasever
Doğa Bekleriz
Gülşen Bubikoğlu
Itır Esen
Gül Gölge
Tuğçe Güder
Yıldız Kaplan
Aysun Kayacı
Tuğçe Kazaz
Çağla Kubat
Manolya Onur
Tuğba Özay
Gamze Özçelik
Jennifer Şebnem Schaefer
Hale Soygazi
Tuba Ünsal

Musicologists 

 Filiz Ali
 Emre Araci
 Rauf Yekta Bey
 Recep Uslu

Music producers 

 Haluk Kurosman
 Ozan Çolakoğlu
 Hasan Saltık

Notable families 

Eczacıbaşı family
Koç family
Köprülü family
Sabancı family

Opera singers 

Esin Afşar
Balık sisters
Semiha Berksoy
Bülent Bezdüz
Burak Bilgili
Leyla Gencer

Painters 
List of Turkish painters
List of Turkish Painters and artists

Philanthropists 

Adile Sultan
Nuri Demirağ
Rahmi Koç
Vehbi Koç
Sakıp Sabancı
Şevket Sabancı

Philosophers

Photographers 

Ara Güler
Ömer Asan
Rahmizâde Bâhâeddin Bediz
Bikem Ekberzade
Burhan Doğançay
İsmail Cem İpekçi
Nasuh Mahruki
Pascal Sebah
Uğur Uluocak

Physicists 

Bulent Atalay
Nihat Berker
Ordal Demokan
Tekin Dereli
Feza Gürsey
Erdal İnönü
Behram Kurşunoğlu
Gökhan Okan
Ekmel Ozbay
Turgay Uzer 
Ismail Akbay
Atok Karaali-Karaali Rocks
Dilhan Eryurt

Pianists 

Fazıl Say
İdil Biret
Hüseyin Sermet
Pekinel sisters

Admirals 

Barbarossa Hayreddin Paşa
Piri Reis
Turgut Reis
Piyale Paşa
Kemal Reis
Seydi Ali Reis
Salih Reis
Kurtoğlu Muslihiddin Reis
Kurtoğlu Hızır Reis
Uluç Ali Reis
Tzachas

Poets

Contemporary poets

Folk poets

Muhlis Akarsu
Nesimi Çimen
Neşet Ertaş
Aşık Veysel Şatıroğlu
Aşık Mahzuni Şerif
Zülfü Livaneli

Ottoman poets

Record producers 

Ozan Çolakoğlu
Ahmet Ertegun
Nesuhi Ertegun
Haluk Kurosman
Arif Mardin
Hasan Saltık

Religious leaders 

Mustafa Çağrıcı
Yaşar Nuri Öztürk
Ali Bardakoğlu

Rabbis 

Aaron Alfandari
Abraham ben Raphael Caro
Yaakov Culi
Ishak Haleva
Joseph ibn Verga
Aaron Lapapa
Hayim Palaggi
Judah Rosanes

Scientists

Screenwriters 

Ömer Lütfi Akad
Murat Aras
Tunç Başaran
Bilge Ebiri
Türker İnanoğlu
Semih Kaplanoğlu
Levent Kazak
Tuncel Kurtiz
Onat Kutlar
Ali Özgentürk
Ferzan Özpetek
Halit Refiğ
Mehmet Tanrısever
Ümit Ünal
Atıf Yılmaz
Cem Yılmaz
Uğur Yücel

Singers/musicians

Sportspeople

Athletes

Halil Akkaş
Eşref Apak
Süreyya Ayhan
Birsen Bekgöz
Ali Ferit Gören (1913-1987), Austrian-Turkish Olympic sprinter
Özge Gürler
Rıza Maksut İşman
Ebru Kavaklıoğlu
Ercüment Olgundeniz
Pınar Saka
Ruhi Sarıalp
Mehmet Terzi
Binnaz Uslu
Nevin Yanıt

Racing drivers

Can Artam
Erkut Kızılırmak
Hakan Dinç
Jason Tahincioglu
Mumtaz Tahincioglu
Burcu Cetinkaya

Basketball coaches

Barbaros Akkaş
Serdar Apaydın
Ergin Ataman
Okan Çevik
Hakan Demir
Murat Didin
Orhun Ene
Harun Erdenay
Yalçın Granit
Zafer Kalaycıoğlu
Ahmet Kandemir
Erman Kunter
Oktay Mahmuti
Aydın Örs
Murat Özyer
Cenk Renda
Ufuk Sarıca
Ercüment Sunter
Levent Topsakal
Arda Vekiloğlu
Ceyhun Yıldızoğlu

Basketball players

A–I

Mustafa Abi
Tutku Açık
Can Akın
Gülşah Akkaya
Cenk Akyol
Furkan Aldemir
Hüseyin Alp
Can Altıntığ
Serdar Apaydın
Ender Arslan
Ömer Aşık
Engin Atsür
Melike Bakırcıoğlu
Doğuş Balbay
Can Bartu
Rasim Başak
Birkan Batuk
Emre Bayav
Hüseyin Beşok
Erdal Bibo
Metecan Birsen
Evren Büker
Ömer Büyükaycan
Hüsnü Çakırgil
Arda Vekiloğlu
Özhan Canaydın
Berkay Candan
Serhat Çetin
Nedim Dal
Begüm Dalgalar
Hakan Demirel
İpek Derici
Kemal Dinçer
Şafak Edge
Selin Ekiz
Orhun Ene
Korel Engin
Burcu Erbaş
Semih Erden
Harun Erdenay
Serkan Erdoğan
Barış Ermiş
Erbil Eroğlu
Tufan Ersöz
Murat Evliyaoğlu
Duygu Fırat
Samet Geyik
Kerem Gönlüm
Zeki Gülay
Muratcan Güler
Sinan Güler
Barış Hersek
Yasemin Horasan
Ersan İlyasova
Serkan İnan
Tuğçe İnöntepe
Şaziye İvegin-Karslı

J–Z

Zafer Kalaycıoğlu
Enes Kanter
İlkan Karaman
Ali Karadeniz
Aysu Keskin
Deniz Kılıçlı
Şebnem Kimyacıoğlu
Yasemin Kimyacıoğlu
İnanç Koç
Can Korkmaz
Göksenin Köksal
Ermal Kurtoğlu
İbrahim Kutluay
Tuğçe Murat
Can Maxim Mutaf
Cemal Nalga
Mehmet Okur
Ömer Onan
Adem Ören
Aydın Örs
Kartal Özmızrak
Cedi Osman
Tamer Oyguç
Cevher Özer
Aytaç Özkul
Arzu Özyiğit
Bora Hun Paçun
Kaya Peker
Nalan Ramazanoğlu
Cenk Renda
Ceren Sarper
Alper Saruhan
Oğuz Savaş
Kenan Sipahi
Fatih Solak
Ümit Sonkol
Sertaç Şanlı
Caner Topaloğlu
Levent Topsakal
Kerem Tunçeri
Esmeral Tunçluer
Mirsad Türkcan
Hidayet Türkoğlu
İzzet Türkyılmaz
Henry Turner
Berk Uğurlu
Birsel Vardarlı
Erkan Veyseloğlu
Mehmet Yağmur
Meriç Banu Yenal
Nilay Yiğit
Haluk Yıldırım
Aylin Yıldızoğlu
Alper Yılmaz
Nevriye Yılmaz
Nedim Yücel
Serap Yücesir
Müjde Yüksel

Carom billiards players

Gülşen Degener
Semih Saygıner

Bodybuilders

Ahmet Enünlü
Cemal Erçman

Boxers 

Serdar Avcı
Selçuk Aydın
Turgut Aykaç
Malik Beyleroğlu
Eyüp Can
Buse Naz Çakıroğlu
Orhan Delibaş
Şennur Demir
Ertuğrul Ergezen
Yakup Kılıç
Adem Kılıççı
Abdülkadir Koçak
Ramaz Paliani
Sinan Şamil Sam
Onder Sipal
Nurhan Süleymanoğlu
Busenaz Sürmeneli
Gülsüm Tatar
Oktay Urkal
Atagün Yalçınkaya

Chess players

Suat Atalık
Tunç Hamarat

Fencers

 İrem Karamete (born 1993), Olympic fencer

Field hockey

Timur Oruz
Selin Oruz

Football managers

A–M

Erdoğan Arıca
Cihat Arman
Abdullah Avcı
Samet Aybaba
Eşfak Aykaç
Giray Bulak
Rıza Çalımbay
Oğuz Çetin
Raşit Çetiner
Mustafa Denizli
Rıdvan Dilmen
Ziya Doğan
Bülent Eken
Muhsin Ertuğral
Fuat Çapa
Şenol Güneş
Ömer Kaner
Rasim Kara
Hikmet Karaman
Ünal Karaman
Suat Kaya
Erdal Keser
Gündüz Kılıç
Aykut Kocaman
Bülent Korkmaz
Güvenç Kurtar
Cemşir Muratoğlu

N–Z

Coşkun Özarı
Arkoç Özcan
Yasin Özdenak
Ertuğrul Sağlam
Nurullah Sağlam
Tugay Semercioğlu
Naci Şensoy
Turgay Şeren
Adnan Suvari
Metin Tekin
Hurser Tekinoktay
Fatih Terim
Tınaz Tırpan
Metin Türel
Ümit Turmuş
Serpil Hamdi Tüzün
Feyyaz Uçar
Turgut Uçar
Telat Üzüm
Yılmaz Vural
Murat Yakın
Fuat Yaman
Ersun Yanal
Ali Sami Yen
Hakkı Yeten
Tayfur Havutçu
Fevzi Zemzem

Footballers

A

Onur Acar
Olcan Adın
Aytaç Ak
Orhan Ak
Muhammed Akagündüz
Bülent Akın
İbrahim Akın
Serhat Akın
Fırat Akkoyun
Ayhan Akman
Birol Aksancak
Altan Aksoy
Cafercan Aksu
Emre Aktaş
Metin Aktaş
Ercan Aktuna
Fatih Akyel
Murat Akyüz
Mehmet Akyüz
Erhan Albayrak
Adem Alkaşi
Ünal Alpuğan
Halil Altıntop
Hamit Altıntop
Yusuf Altuntaş
Ogün Altıparmak
Erdoğan Arıca
Hakan Arıkan
Cihat Arman
Volkan Arslan
Kemal Aslan
Metin Aslan
Emre Aşık
Çağdaş Atan
Necati Ateş
Yasin Avcı
Koray Avcı
İbrahim Aydemir
Erhan Aydın
Necat Aygün
Devran Ayhan
Yalçın Ayhan
Eşfak Aykaç
Serkan Aykut
Gündüz Gürol Azer

B–C

Volkan Babacan
Ediz Bahtiyaroğlu
Alper Balaban
Serkan Balcı
Hakan Balta
Deniz Barış
Can Bartu
Yıldıray Baştürk
Özgür Bayer
Deniz Baykara
Sedat Bayrak
Hakan Bayraktar
Emre Belözoğlu
Ferhat Bıkmaz
Recep Biler
Ali Bilgin
Coşkun Birdal
Zafer Biryol
Bülent Bölükbaşı
Uğur Boral
Mehmet Budak
Erol Bulut
Umut Bulut
Okan Buruk
Adem Büyük
Musa Büyük
Mehmet Çakır
Yasin Çakmak
Serkan Çalik
Oğuz Çalışkan
Cihan Can
Ömer Çatkıç
Yasin Çelik
Oğuz Çetin
Recep Çetin
Servet Çetin
Mustafa Cevahir
Orhan Çıkırıkçı
Daniyel Cimen
Hüseyin Çimşir
Ferhat Çökmüş
Tanju Çolak
Tayfun Çora
Olgay Coskun
Bilal Çubukçu

D–E

Ekrem Dağ
Oğuz Dağlaroğlu
Ilie Datcu
Ümit Davala
Aykut Demir
Cem Demir
Taner Demirbaş
Volkan Demirel
Serol Demirhan
Christian Demirtas
Mustafa Denizli
Abdurrahman Dereli
Oktay Derelioğlu
Rıdvan Dilmen
Basri Dirimlili
Deniz Doğan
Hüzeyfe Doğan
Ziya Doğan
Osman Kürşat Duman
Adem Dursun
Ahmet Dursun
Murat Duruer
Kürşat Duymuş
Ibrahim Ege
Bülent Eken
Ferdi Elmas
Fevzi Elmas
Alpaslan Eratlı
Abdullah Ercan
Aykut Erçetin
Arif Erdem
Mülayim Erdem
Naci Erdem
Evren Erdeniz
Mevlüt Erdinç
Mert Erdoğan
Murat Erdoğan
Mahmut Hanefi Erdoğdu
Emrah Eren
Ceyhun Eriş
Adnan Erkan
Caner Erkin
Rober Eryol

F–J

Berkant Göktan
Gökhan Gönül
Şanver Göymen
Hürriyet Güçer
Şükrü Gülesin
Ceyhun Gülselam
Ali Güneş
Şenol Güneş
Serdar Güneş
Emre Güngör
Gürhan Gürsoy
Mehmet Güven
Emrullah Güvenç
Serdal Güvenç
Sercan Güvenışık
Umut Güzelses
Murat Hacıoğlu
Hamza Hamzaoğlu
Şeref Has
Tayfur Havutçu
Topuz Hikmet
Hakkı Hocaoğlu
Özer Hurmacı
Efe İnanç
Vedat İnceefe
Uğur İnceman
Engin İpekoğlu
Bekir İrtegün
Cenk İşler
Kemal İzzet
Muzzy İzzet

K–L

Hasan Kabze
Tolunay Kafkas
İlyas Kahraman
Nihat Kahveci
Sinan Kaloğlu
Ömer Kaner
Jem Karacan
Azar Karadaş
Batuhan Karadeniz
Gökdeniz Karadeniz
Burak Karaduman
Anıl Karaer
Ümit Karan
Arif Karaoğlan
Levent Kartop
Veli Kavlak
Uğur Kavuk
Onur Kaya
Suat Kaya
Colin Kazim-Richards
Tugay Kerimoğlu
Erdal Keser
Mustafa Keçeli
Gündüz Kılıç
Zafer Kılıçkan
Serkan Kırıntılı
Bilal Kısa
Mehmet Sarper Kiskaç
Ferhat Kıskanç
Okan Koç
Adem Koçak
Celaleddin Koçak
Aykut Kocaman
Ender Konca
Egemen Korkmaz
Mert Korkmaz
Tayfun Korkut
Tevfik Köse
Serdar Kulbilge
Ramazan Kurşunlu
Serdar Kurtuluş
Ahmet Kuru
Uğur Arslan Kuru
Erhan Kuşkapan
Hakan Kutlu

M–Q

Hami Mandıralı
İlhan Mansız
Baki Mercimek
Tümer Metin
Murat Ocak
Metin Oktay
Ali Ölmez
Özden Öngün
Alpay Özalan
Coşkun Özarı
Ümit Özat
Barış Özbek
Arkoç Özcan
Özgürcan Özcan
Mehmet Özdilek
Kenan Özer
Zafer Özgültekın
Nesim Özgür
Mesut Özil
Mustafa Özkan
Serdar Özkan
Osman Özköylü
Serkan Özsoy
Ferhat Öztorun
Okan Öztürk
Sezer Öztürk
Yüsüf Öztürk
Emre Öztürk
Cem Pamiroğlu
İlhan Parlak
Ergün Penbe
Necmi Perekli

R–T

Rüştü Reçber
Omer Riza
Oğuz Sabankay
Ertuğrul Sağlam
Mahir Sağlık
Selçuk Şahin
Zafer Şakar
Saffet Sancaklı
Tuncay
Burhan Sargın
Adem Sarı
Sabri Sarıoğlu
Yüksel Sariyar
Hasan Şaş
Halil Savran
Mehmet Scholl
Mehmet Sedef
Turgay Semercioğlu
Ziya Şengül
Semih Şentürk
Mehmet Kutay Şenyıl
Ömer Sepici
Turgay Şeren
Tayfun Seven
Tolga Seyhan
Suleyman Sleyman
Fatih Sonkaya
Yusuf Soysal
Zeki Rıza Sporel
Hakan Şükür
Elyasa Süme
Feridun Sungur
Ali Tandoğan
Kaya Tarakçı
Anıl Taşdemir
Fahri Tatan
Metin Tekin
Fatih Tekke
Ogün Temizkanoğlu
Fatih Terim
Mehmet Topal
Mehmet Topuz
İbrahim Toraman
Murat Tosun
Ramazan Tunç
Fevzi Tuncay
Onur Tuncer
Önder Turacı
Arda Turan
Cemil Turan
Suat Türker
Uğur Tütüneker

U–Z

Feyyaz Uçar
Uğur Uçar
Hasan Üçüncü
Gökhan Ünal
Volkan Ünlü
Hakan Ünsal
Orkun Usak
Suat Usta
Engin Verel
Aytekin Viduşlu
Wederson
Lev Yalcin
Sergen Yalçın
Volkan Yaman
Erdinç Yavuz
Zafer Yelen
Sedat Yeşilkaya
Hakkı Yeten
Müjdat Yetkiner
Faruk Yiğit
Mehmet Yıldız
Yıldo
Aydın Yılmaz
Burak Yılmaz
Deniz Yilmaz
Mehmet Yılmaz (striker)
Mehmet Yılmaz (defender)
Okan Yılmaz
Özgür Yılmaz
Hüseyin Yoğurtçu
Muhammet Hanifi Yoldaş
Mehmet Yozgatlı
Can Emre Yücel
Selçuk Yula
Rahim Zafer
Gökhan Zan
Fevzi Zemzem
Kerim Zengin
Tolga Zengin

Gymnasts
Ferhat Arıcan
İbrahim Çolak (gymnast)
Duygu Doğan
Göksu Üçtaş Şanlı
Ümit Şamiloğlu
Ayşe Begüm Onbaşı
Dilara Yurtdaş
Ahmet Önder

Martial artists

Judoka 

Salim Abanoz
Derya Cıbır
Bektaş Demirel
Sezer Huysuz
Belkıs Zehra Kaya
Gülşah Kocatürk
Cemal Oğuz
Hüseyin Özkan
Hülya Şenyurt
Selim Tataroğlu
Irfan Toker
Iraklı Uznadze
Özgür Yılmaz

Karateka 

Haldun Alagaş
Ugur Aktas (karateka)
Yıldız Aras
Merve Coban
Gülderen Çelik
Ömer Kemaloğlu
Tuba Yakan
Serap Özçelik

Kickboxers 

Erhan Deniz
Murat Direkçi
Yeliz Fındık
Gülşah Kıyak
Asiye Özlem Şahin
Hülya Şahin
Gökhan Saki
Şahin Yakut

Mixed martial artists 

Gökhan Saki
Alptekin Özkiliç

Muay Thai practitioners 

Ayşegül Behlivan
Yeliz Fındık
Nurhayat Hiçyakmazer

Taekwondo practitioners

Yeliz Fındık
Azize Tanrıkulu
Bahri Tanrıkulu
Nur Tatar
Servet Tazegül
Çetin Topçuoğlu
Hamide Bıkçın Tosun

Wrestlers 

Riza Kayaalp
Taha Akgül
Yaşar Doğu
Hergeleci Ibrahim
Şeref Eroğlu

Wushu practitioners 

Ayşegül Behlivan
Lehize Hilal Benli
Hüseyin Dündar
Yeliz Fındık
Nurhayat Hiçyakmazer
Gülşah Kıyak
Öznur Kızıl

Motorcycle racers

Bahattin Sofuoğlu
Kenan Sofuoğlu
Sinan Sofuoğlu

Mountain climbers

Nasuh Mahruki
Eylem Elif Maviş
Burçak Özoğlu Poçan
Serhan Poçan
Uğur Uluocak

Olympic competitors for Turkey

Eşref Apak
Sedat Artuç
Süreyya Ayhan
Ahmet Ayık
Kelime Aydın
Selçuk Aydın
Kazım Ayvaz
Mithat Bayrak
Derya Büyükuncu
Mustafa Dağıstanlı
Bektaş Demirel
Mete Gazoz
Rıza Maksut İşman
Ebru Kavaklıoğlu
Muhammet Kızılarslan
Halil Mutlu
Sebahattin Oglago
Ruhi Sarıalp
Naim Süleymanoğlu
Şule Şahbaz
Hamit Şare
Uğur Taner
Selim Tataroğlu
Nurcan Taylan
Hamide Bıkçın Tosun
Duygu Ulusoy
Iraklı Uznadze
Atagün Yalçınkaya

Swimmers

Derya Büyükuncu
Emre Sakçı
Uğur Taner

Tennis players

Çağla Büyükakçay
Marsel İlhan
Pemra Özgen
Melis Sezer
İpek Soylu
İpek Şenoğlu

Volleyball players

Çağla Akın
Kübra Akman
Naz Aydemir Akyol 
Hande Baladın
Emre Batur
Neslihan Demir
Alperay Demirciler
Eda Erdem 
Gizem Güreşen
Ebrar Karakurt
Buse Kayacan
Resul Tekeli
Murat Yenipazar
Halil İbrahim Yücel
Özge Yurtdagülen
Güldeniz Önal
Gizem Örge
Özlem Özçelik
Neriman Özsoy

Weightlifters

Wrestlers

Nasuh Akar
Mahmut Atalay
Celal Atik
İsmet Atlı
Ahmet Ayık
Kazım Ayvaz
Mithat Bayrak
Ahmet Bilek
Gazanfer Bilge
Nuri Boytorun
Mehmet Çoban
Mustafa Dağıstanlı
Mahmut Demir
Yaşar Doğu
Yaşar Erkan
Şeref Eroğlu
Hasan Gemici
Hasan Güngör
Hamit Kaplan
Ahmet Kireççi
Tevfik Kış
Kurtdereli Mehmet Pehlivan
İsmail Ogan
Mehmet Oktav
Mehmet Özal
Mehmet Akif Pirim
Müzahir Sille
Bayram Şit
Tayyar Yalaz
Hamza Yerlikaya

Sculptors 

Mehmet Aksoy (sculptor)
Tankut Öktem
Sevgi Çağal
Kamil Sonad
kenan Yontunç

Songwriters 

Barış Manço
Cem Adrian
Sezen Aksu
Mazhar Alanson
Aslı
Aydilge
Emre Aydın
Yavuz Bingöl
Kenan Doğulu
Feridun Düzağaç
Sertab Erener
Şebnem Ferah
Orhan Gencebay
Nil Karaibrahimgil
Kayahan
Kıraç
Kâzım Koyuncu
Burak Kut
Zülfü Livaneli
Zeki Müren
Nazan Öncel
Serdar Ortaç
Bülent Ortaçgil
Tarkan
Ferdi Tayfur
Özlem Tekin
Hande Yener
Levent Yüksel

Television personalities 

Okan Bayülgen
Hakan Celik
Arda Öcal
Deniz Orhun

Television presenters 

Ali İhsan Varol
Deniz Orhun
Mehmet Ali Birand
Okan Bayülgen
Reha Muhtar
Şebnem Dönmez
Uğur Dündar
Zeynep Tokuş

Others

 Bajkam, military commander
 Sadun Boro, sailor and global circumnavigator 
 Ahmet the Calligrapher, saint
 Hasan Çelebi, calligrapher
 Nejat Eczacıbaşı, pharmaceutical entrepreneur
 Hadi Elazzi, talent manager
 İlhan Erdost, publisher
 Erden Eruç, completed first solo human-powered circumnavigation of the Earth by rowboat, sea kayak, bicycle and foot
 Kara Fatma, female hero
 Ghias ad-Din, was a member of the Seljuq dynasty of Rum
 Levent Kazak, scriptwriter
 Nasuh Mahruki, first Turkish summiter of Mt. Everest
 Janet Akyüz Mattei, astronomer
 Tatikios (c. 1048 - died after 1110), Byzantine general
 Neyzen Tevfik, neyzen

See also

List of Turkish Armenians
List of Turkish scientists
List of assassinated people from Turkey
List of French Turks
List of Governors of the Central Bank of Turkey
List of spouses of the Presidents of Turkey
List of Ministers of National Defence of Turkey
List of Ministers of National Education of Turkey
List of Turkish billionaires by net worth
List of contemporary Turkish poets
List of presidents of the Constitutional Court of Turkey
List of people on the postage stamps of Turkey
Turkish women in sports